Nathalie Obadia (born 14 March 1962) is a French art gallery owner. She specialises in contemporary art.

Early life 
She was born in Toulouse, France. As a teenager, Nathalie Obadia completed an internship at Daniel Varenne, in Genova, and Adrien Maeght, in Paris. She studied a master's degree in Law at the Paris Institute of Political Studies, then worked at the Galerie Daniel Templon from 1988 to 1992.

Career
She opened her first gallery in 1993, in Marais in Paris. The gallery included work by a generation of French artists, including Carole Benzaken (Prix Marcel Duchamp, 2004), Valérie Favre and Pascal Pinaud. Later the gallery expanded to include international artists, including Jessica Stockholder, Albert Oehlen, Fiona Rae and Manuel Ocampo.

In 1995, Nathalie Obadia opened a larger gallery near the Pompidou Centre in Paris that moved to its current address in 2003.

From 2005 to 2008 she was vice president of the 'Comité professionnel des galeries d'art (CPGA)', a French association that aims to represent French art galleries to public authorities.

She opened a new space in 2013.

Obadia teaches a class on 'Analysis of the Contemporary Art Market' at the Paris Institute of Political Studies (Sciences Po, Paris).

Honours 
 Officer of the Order of Arts and Letters 
 Knight of the National Order of Merit

Represented artists 
 Brook Andrew  
 Edgar Arceneaux  
 Barry X Ball  
 Rina Banerjee  
 Valérie Belin  
 Rosson Crow  
 Luc Delahaye  
 Shirley Jaffe  
 Seydou Keïta  
 Lu Chao  
 Youssef Nabil  
 Manuel Ocampo  
 Chloe Piene  
 Laure Prouvost  
 Fiona Rae  
 Mithu Sen  
 Andres Serrano  
 Lorna Simpson  
 Mickalene Thomas  
 Nicola Tyson  
 Agnès Varda  
 Brenna Youngblood  
 Xu Zhen by MadeIn Company

References

External links 
 Site internet de la Galerie Nathalie Obadia

French art dealers
Living people
Officiers of the Ordre des Arts et des Lettres
1962 births
Women art dealers